Monopoly: The Card Game is loosely based on the board game Monopoly. The idea is to draw, trade and organize cards into "color-groups" along with bonus cards. Players take turns drawing and discarding cards until one completes a hand. The value of each player's hand is then counted and they receive the amount of Monopoly money they have earned. The first person to collect $10,000 wins.

The game was produced and sold by Winning Moves Games under license from Hasbro. It is no longer in production.

Deck
The deck contains 60 cards. The 28 property cards are the same as those in the standard Monopoly game. Each of these cards (except the railroads and utilities) have a distinct color band on the top and bottom, representing the "color-group" to which it belongs. The card also displays the property name, the number of cards in its "color-group," and the value of the complete group and of each house attached.

15 are house cards and 2 hotel cards. Players may add these cards onto any complete color-group. Players do not need to have all 4 houses and a hotel to go out, but any houses must be built in sequence (house 2 cannot be used without first having house 1). Houses cannot be built on railroads and utilities. Each house is worth the same amount as the completed color-group upon which it is built. Hotels are worth $500 regardless of where they are built.

6 are token cards. Each token card pays off the value of one colour group (as stated on the cards).

The 6 bonus cards each double the value of a player's hand. The 4 "GO" cards are each worth $200. Four Mr. Monopoly cards are included; whoever has the most of these cards at the end of the hand gets $1000. 2 Chance cards may represent any card in the deck needed to complete a set; however, these cards are only useful to the person who goes out at the end of the hand. If a player has a Chance card and someone else goes out, his or her entire hand is worth nothing and scores $0 for that round.

The score is kept with the pad of money notepad enclosed inside the box. Each player is dealt their amount of money after each round.

Rules per number of players

4-Player Rules 
Each player is dealt 10 cards (face down, clockwise) by the dealer. The dealer then places another card in front of each player, face up. These are the players' discard piles. Cards in the discard piles are fanned so each player can see all the cards. The deck is then placed in the middle of the playing area; this is the draw pile. The dealer passes clockwise.

Players must always have a total of 10 cards in their hand after their turn is over.

The person to the left of the dealer goes first, and they may choose to do one of the following:
 Draw from the draw pile - If a player chooses to draw, they take the top card from the draw pile and end their turn by discarding a card.
 Trade for a card in another player's discard pile - A player may trade any number of cards from their discard pile for the same number of cards in another's pile. The player may discard from their hand first to get the cards of another player. The player takes the number of cards to trade and puts them in the hand of the trading player (they must discard extra cards from their hand on their next turn). The player then takes the desired cards from the top of that person's discard pile. The turn ends by discarding excess cards. 
 Discard to go out - If a player has a full "color-group" with houses (if any) in order and no unmatched property or house cards — the player may go out. On the next turn, excess cards are discarded and the player announces that they are going out. This round is now over.

The player who goes out gets the reward of the top 5 cards from the draw pile, and they may use these cards if they help their hand. Before scoring, move all excess cards away. To score, count the values of each person's hand. Remember that any person with a Chance card, other than the person who went out, scores $0 for the round. The deal now passes to the left and the new dealer shuffles and re-deals the cards. Play stops when someone gets $10,000.

Three players 
For a 3-player game, the play is mostly the same, except that a 4th discard pile is created where the 4th player would be. This way, players still have a variety of choices for trading. In a 3-player game, valid moves are:

 Exchange the top card on another player's discard pile for the top card of the "4th player's" discard pile, or
 Take the top cards of both the "4th player's" discard pile and the draw pile and replace them with the top two cards of the player's pile.

Two players 
Similar to the 3-player game, the only difference is that two additional/extra discard piles are created instead of only having one.

Five or six players 
For 5-10 player games, the game is slightly different. The whole deck is dealt out with no draw pile.

 For 5-player games, 12 cards are dealt with each player.
 For 6-player games, 10 cards are dealt with each player.

A trading card is also dealt to each player face up.

Each player must trade cards with another player, and both players put the cards into their hands. Both players must then discard one card. After all, players have gone once, each player passes one card to their left and puts it in their hand after each time around.

Going out occurs on one of two occasions:
 After completing a turn, or
 Before players would normally pass a card left.

The reward for going out is the trade cards on the table. The winner is the first to $7,000.

References

External links 

 

Card games introduced in 2000
Monopoly (game)
Dedicated deck card games